Daniela Moise (born 4 December 1964) is a Romanian former professional tennis player.

Moise was a mixed doubles gold medalist for Romania at the 1985 Summer Universiade in Kobe, with Florin Segărceanu. She was a member of Romania's Federation Cup team in 1986. Featuring in four ties, she won singles matches over Paulina Sepúlveda, Patricia Medrado and Jennifer Thornton.

ITF finals

Singles: 2 (0–2)

Doubles: 2 (1–1)

References

External links
 
 
 

1964 births
Living people
Romanian female tennis players
Universiade medalists in tennis
Universiade gold medalists for Romania
Medalists at the 1985 Summer Universiade